The European Yo-Yo Championship (EYYC) is the European competition of yo-yo organized and sanctioned by the International Yo-Yo Federation (IYYF), and is one of 4 annual multi-national yo-yo competitions from which winners receive seeds to compete in the semi-finals of the annual World Yo-Yo Contest.

Contests
EYYC has 5 European Title Divisions in 2011.

Host nations

Participating nations
Participating nations are mainly, but not limited to nations situated in the continent of Europe. Exceptions have been made for some non-European countries in West Asia such as Armenia in West Asia and past Republics of the Soviet Union, and most recently Israel. These countries are permitted to compete at the discretion of the International Yo-Yo Federation (IYYF), either due to their geographical distance from their respective multi-national competitions, or due to the lack of a multi-national competition in their respective continent.

The following list shows countries which are permitted to participate as of EYYC 2015.

West Europe

Northern Ireland
 Principality of Sealand

East Europe
 Abkhazia

 South Ossetia

North Europe

South Europe

Other

List of champions

Championships

1A

2A

3A

4A

5A

AP

Spin Top

Non Championship Divisions

Open 1A

1A Junior

Trick Ladder

1A Women’s freestyle

See also
World Yo-Yo Contest
U.S. National Yo-Yo Contest
International Yo-Yo Federation

References

External links
International Yo-Yo Federation
EYYC 2011
EYYC 2012
EYYC 2013
EYYC 2014
EYYC 2015
EYYC 2010 Results
EYYC 2011 Results
EYYC 2012 Results
EYYC 2012 Full Results
EYYC 2013 Results

Yo-yo competitions